Johol  (Jawi: جوهول) is a town, a mukim and a state assembly constituency in Kuala Pilah District, Negeri Sembilan, Malaysia. It is roughly halfway between Tampin and Kuala Pilah, along Federal Route 9.

Features 
Johol town houses one of the oldest surviving Shell service stations in the country, dating back to the 1930s. It is located along Jalan Besar (highway 9).

Politics
Johol is one of the constituent Minangkabau states, known as luaks, that formed Negeri Sembilan.  The reigning Undang of the Luak of Johol is Datuk Johan Pahlawan Lela Perkasa Setiawan Muhammad Abdullah (The 15th Undang). He is one of the four Undangs that will participate in the election of the Yamtuan Besar of Negeri Sembilan; the other three are from Sungai Ujong (which included the capital Seremban and Port Dickson), Jelebu and Rembau.

Johol is part of the parliamentary constituency of Kuala Pilah. Johol is also a constituency of the Negeri Sembilan State Legislative Assembly.

References

Kuala Pilah District
Mukims of Negeri Sembilan